The AN 51 was a French tactical nuclear warhead used on the Pluton short range missile, the Pluton system was retired in 1992–93. The warhead was based upon the MR 50 CTC (charge tactique commune - common tactical warhead) warhead, with the same physics package as used in the AN 52 bomb. It had two yields; 10 and 25 kt.

References
Norris, Robert, Burrows, Andrew, Fieldhouse, Richard Nuclear Weapons Databook, Volume V, British, French and Chinese Nuclear Weapons, San Francisco, Westview Press, 1994, 

Nuclear warheads of France
French Army
Military equipment introduced in the 1970s